Vachellia caven var. microcarpa is a perennial tree native to Argentina and Paraguay.

References

Bibliography 
 Anthony E. Orchard & Annette J. G. Wilson: Flora of Australia: Mimosaceae Acacia, Band 11, Teil 1: Mimosaceae, Acacia, Csiro Publishing, 2001, 673 Seiten ISBN 9780643057029
 Clement, B.A., Goff, C.M., Forbes, T.D.A. Toxic Amines and Alkaloids from Acacia rigidula, Phytochem. 1998, 49(5), 1377.
 Shulgin, Alexander and Ann, TiHKAL the Continuation. Transform Press, 1997. ISBN 0-9630096-9-9
 Stephen Midgley, Peter Stevens, Ben Richardson, Paul Gioia & Nicholas Lander: WorldWideWattle - Webseite über die Akazien, mit einem Schwerpunkt auf die australischen Arten.

caven var. microcarpa
Trees of Argentina
Trees of Paraguay